Berkshire Hathaway GUARD Insurance Companies   currently insure over 250,000 businesses in the US.

History
In July 1982, the company's original subsidiaries were formed in Wilkes-Barre, Pennsylvania, by Susan and Judd Shoval and a group of private investors. One year later, the first Workers’ Compensation insurance policy was issued in Pennsylvania and about a half million dollars in premium were written throughout 1983. The company grew, adding states and acquiring Mutual Fire Insurance Company of Saco, Maine, in 1995. By 2007, GUARD had expanded under the Shovals' leadership to four insurance carriers (NorGUARD, AmGUARD, EastGUARD, and WestGUARD) writing $200 million of Workers’ Compensation insurance in 23 states.

The company was acquired in 2007 by Clal Insurance Enterprises Holdings Ltd., an international insurance group. Sy Foguel joined the organization (now under new ownership) as CEO and introduced additional lines of coverage. In 2012, the organization became a wholly owned subsidiary of National Indemnity Company, which is part of the Berkshire Hathaway Group.

By the end of 2016, the company was writing over $1 billion in premium, operating nationwide, and actively writing seven other lines of insurance — Businessowner's Policies, Commercial Liability umbrella/excess, commercial auto, professional liability, statutory disability coverage, and homeowners/personal umbrella. Berkshire Hathaway GUARD currently has eight locations throughout the United States but remains headquartered in Wilkes-Barre, Pennsylvania.

Trivia
The original building housing Berkshire Hathaway GUARD's corporate operations was formerly the Lehigh and Wilkes-Barre Coal Company building in Wilkes-Barre.  The structure was built in 1908 in an unprecedented speed of 90 days.

In 1995, the company acquired Mutual Fire Insurance Company of Saco, Maine, the second oldest insurer in the United States.

Various Recognition and Rankings
Berkshire Hathaway GUARD was named a Ward's 50 Top Performer for 2012, a distinction placing the company within the top 2% of all property and casualty insurance companies nationwide.

Warren Buffett referenced GUARD INSURANCE, its CEO Sy Foguel, and the city of Wilkes-Barre, Pennsylvania in his 2019 Shareholder Letter; "Late in 2012, Ajit Jain, the invaluable manager of our insurance operations, called to tell me that he was buying a tiny company – GUARD Insurance Group – in that small Pennsylvania city for $221 million (roughly its net worth at the time). He added that Sy Foguel, GUARD’s CEO, was going to be a star at Berkshire. Both GUARD and Sy were new names to me. Bingo and bingo: In 2019, GUARD had premium volume of $1.9 billion, up 379% since 2012, and also delivered a satisfactory underwriting profit. Since joining Berkshire, Sy has led the company into both new products and new regions of the country and has increased GUARD’s float by 265%."

References

External links
 Berkshire Hathaway GUARD’s Corporate Web Site
 Bloomberg Company Profile of Berkshire Hathaway GUARD
 Warren Buffet's 2019 Letter to Berkshire Hathaway Shareholders
 Highlights from Warren Buffet's 2020 Shareholder Letter

Financial services companies established in 1982
Insurance companies of the United States
American companies established in 1982
Privately held companies based in Pennsylvania
1982 establishments in Pennsylvania